Cryptolectica pasaniae is a moth of the family Gracillariidae. It is known from Hong Kong and Japan (the Ryukyu Islands).

The wingspan is 8.0–10.2 mm.

The larvae feed on Lithocarpus edulis, Pasania edulis and Quercus myrsinifolia. They probably mine the leaves of their host plant.

References

Acrocercopinae
Moths of Japan
Moths described in 1988